Ushida Station is the name of several train stations in Japan.

 Ushida Station (Aichi) - In Aichi Prefecture, run by Nagoya Railroad
 Ushida Station (Tokyo) - In Tokyo, run by Tobu Railway